Casino Royale is a 2006 spy film, the twenty-first in the Eon Productions James Bond series, and the third screen adaptation of Ian Fleming's 1953 novel of the same name. Directed by Martin Campbell from a screenplay by Neil Purvis, Robert Wade, and Paul Haggis, it stars Daniel Craig in his first appearance as Bond, alongside Eva Green, Mads Mikkelsen, Judi Dench, and Jeffrey Wright. In the film, Bond is on assignment to bankrupt terrorist financier Le Chiffre (Mikkelsen) in a high-stakes poker game at the Casino Royale in Montenegro.

Following Die Another Day (2002), Eon decided to reboot the franchise, attempting to counteract perceived unrealistic elements of previous entries and instead explore a less experienced, more vulnerable Bond. Casting involved a widespread search for a new actor to succeed Pierce Brosnan as Bond; the choice of Craig, announced in October 2005, proved controversial. Principal photography took place in the Bahamas, Italy, the United Kingdom, and the Czech Republic, with interior sets built at Pinewood Studios and  Barrandov Studios. Casino Royale features primarily practical stuntwork as opposed to the computer-generated placements seen in other Bond films.

Casino Royale premiered at the Odeon Leicester Square on 14 November 2006, and was theatrically released first in the United Kingdom on 16 November, and in the United States a day later. The film received critical acclaim, with praise for Craig's reinvention of the character and its departure from the tropes of previous Bond films. It grossed over $ worldwide, becoming the fourth highest-grossing film of 2006 and the highest-grossing James Bond film until the release of Skyfall (2012). The sequel, Quantum of Solace, was released in 2008.

Plot
MI6 operative James Bond earns his licence to kill and promotion to 00 agent status by assassinating the traitorous Dryden and his contact at the British Embassy in Prague. In Uganda, Mr. White introduces Steven Obanno, a high-ranking member of the Lord's Resistance Army, to Le Chiffre, an Albanian private banker to terrorists. Obanno entrusts Le Chiffre with $100million to invest. Using knowledge of his own upcoming terrorist attack on aerospace manufacturer Skyfleet, Le Chiffre shorts the company's stock. 

In Madagascar, Bond blows up an embassy while capturing and then killing a bomb-maker named Mollaka. MI6 chief M admonishes Bond for causing an international incident and ignoring her orders to take Mollaka alive. Using the information on Mollaka's phone, Bond is led to the Bahamas and a corrupt Greek official, Alex Dimitrios, who had hired Mollaka at Le Chiffre's request to bomb Skyfleet's prototype airliner. After winning Dimitrios' vintage Aston Martin in a poker game and seducing his wife, Solange, Bond pursues Dimitrios to Miami. Bond fends off an attack by Dimitrios and kills him. At the airport, Bond chases down the new bomber Dimitrios has hired and thwarts the destruction of the Skyfleet airliner. With the Skyfleet stock secure, Le Chiffre loses Obanno's money. Surmising that somebody talked about the terrorist plot, Le Chiffre tortures Solange to death.

To recoup his clients' money, Le Chiffre organizes a Texas hold 'em tournament at the Casino Royale in Montenegro. MI6 enters Bond — the agency's best poker player — in the tournament, believing a defeat will force Le Chiffre to seek asylum with the British government in exchange for information on his clients. Bond is paired with Vesper Lynd, a British Treasury agent overseeing the $10million buy-in. They meet their contact, René Mathis, in Montenegro. Obanno, furious that his money is missing, threatens Le Chiffre but allows him to continue playing to win back the money. Obanno and his bodyguard attack Bond, who kills them both. Bond loses his $10million stake after Le Chiffre is tipped off about his own tell, and Vesper refuses to authorize an additional $5million for Bond to continue. But fellow player Felix Leiter, a CIA agent, stakes Bond to the money in exchange for letting his agency take Le Chiffre into custody. Le Chiffre's lover, Valenka, poisons Bond's martini, but Vesper rescues him. Bond returns to the game and wins the tournament. Le Chiffre kidnaps Vesper to trap Bond and takes them to an abandoned ship. He tortures Bond to reveal the password to the bank account holding the winnings, but Bond resists. Mr. White bursts in and kills Le Chiffre but inexplicably spares Bond and Vesper.

Bond awakens in hospital and recovers with Vesper at his side. He has Mathis apprehended after believing that he had tipped off Le Chiffre about his tell. Bond falls in love with Vesper and resigns from MI6. The couple sails to Venice. When M reveals that his winnings were never transferred to the British treasury, Bond realizes that Vesper has betrayed him. He tails her to a hand-off of the money, where gunmen spot him and take her captive inside a Venetian palace undergoing restoration. Bond shoots the building's flotation devices, causing it to gradually sink into the Grand Canal as he picks off the shooters. Vesper is imprisoned in the building's elevator and, after locking herself in to prevent Bond from saving her, drowns. Mr. White, meanwhile, escapes with the money.

M informs Bond, who has returned to service, that the organization behind Le Chiffre threatened to kill Vesper's lover unless she became a double agent. When Bond angrily denounces Vesper as a traitor, M reasons that she likely made a deal with White by trading the winnings for Bond's life. Realizing Vesper left her phone to help him, Bond checks the contacts and locates Mr. White at an estate in Lake Como. He shoots White in the leg and introduces himself: "The name's Bond, James Bond".

Cast

 Daniel Craig as James Bond: A British MI6 officer newly assigned 00 status, giving him a licence to kill. He is sent on a mission to arrest a bomb-maker in Madagascar, where he stumbles upon Le Chiffre's terrorist cell and is then sent to defeat him in a high-stakes poker game at Casino Royale.
 Eva Green as Vesper Lynd: An agent for Her Majesty's Treasury assigned to supervise Bond and finance him in a high-stakes poker game. 
 Mads Mikkelsen as Le Chiffre: A banker who services many of the world's criminals and terrorists and associate partner of Spectre, he is a mathematical genius and expert chess player, using these skills when playing poker.
 Giancarlo Giannini as René Mathis: Bond's contact in Montenegro.
 Jesper Christensen as Mr. White: A liaison for an unnamed criminal organization (the nature of this group is explored more in the next film Quantum of Solace).
 Judi Dench as M: The head of MI6. Although she feels she has promoted Bond too soon and chides him for his rash actions, she plays an important maternal figure in his life. Dench was the only cast member retained from the Pierce Brosnan films.
 Tobias Menzies as Villiers: M's young secretary at MI6 headquarters. His character's last name is a reference to James Villiers, who portrayed Bill Tanner in For Your Eyes Only, and to the character of Amherst Villiers in the original novel.
 Isaach de Bankolé as Steven Obanno: A leader of the Lord's Resistance Army, he is introduced to Le Chiffre by Mr. White to account his finances.
 Simon Abkarian as Alex Dimitrios: A contractor in the international criminal underworld and associate of Le Chiffre, he is based in the Bahamas.
 Ivana Miličević as Valenka: Le Chiffre's girlfriend and henchwoman, she accompanies him to the poker game.
 Caterina Murino as Solange Dimitrios: Dimitrios's wife; Bond seduces her, causing her unintentionally to reveal one of his plans. After Bond kills Dimitrios, she is found tortured and killed.
 Claudio Santamaria as Carlos: A terrorist employed by Le Chiffre to blow up an aircraft.
 Sébastien Foucan as Mollaka: A bomb-maker pursued by Bond through a construction site in Madagascar. Credited in opening title cards under "Free running stunts".
 Jeffrey Wright as Felix Leiter: A CIA operative, he is participating in the poker tournament while assisting Bond. This is the first Eon-produced Bond film in which Leiter is played by a black actor. (Leiter was played by black actor Bernie Casey in Never Say Never Again, which was not produced by Eon.)

Casino Royale includes a cameo by British entrepreneur Richard Branson (seen being TSA-screened at Miami International Airport). The cameo was cut out of the in-flight versions shown on British Airways' in-flight entertainment systems, and the Virgin Atlantic aircraft Branson supplied had its tail fin (bearing the company logo) obscured. Brazilian model Alessandra Ambrosio makes an unspoken cameo as a tennis player.

Production

Development 
Casino Royale had been produced as a 1954 television episode starring Barry Nelson as Bond and Peter Lorre as the villain Le Chiffre, as well as a non-canonical 1967 ensemble satirical film starring David Niven, Peter Sellers and Woody Allen. Eon Productions gained the rights to Casino Royale in 1999 after Sony Pictures Entertainment exchanged them for Metro-Goldwyn-Mayer's rights to Spider-Man. In March 2004, Neal Purvis and Robert Wade began writing a screenplay for Pierce Brosnan as Bond, aiming to bring back the flavour of Ian Fleming's original Bond novels. An early draft featured Bond backpacking in Madagascar and playing chess with Lord Lucan. As the drafts got closer to the final storyline, the opening scene in which Bond earns his 00 license was originally going to consist of an adaptation of either the short stories "The Hildebrand Rarity" or "007 in New York." Rather than bombing the Skyfleet jet, there would have been a hijacking of a cruise ship in Cape Town. Paul Haggis' main contribution was to rewrite the climax of the film. He explained, "the draft that was there was very faithful to the book and there was a confession, so in the original draft, the character confessed and killed herself. She then sent Bond to chase after the villains; Bond chased the villains into the house. I don't know why but I thought that Vesper had to be in the sinking house and Bond has to want to kill her and then try and save her." Haggis also said they wanted "to do for Bond what Batman Begins did for Batman." Broccoli and Wilson were mindful that "Die Another Day had become too fantastical", feeling the next film should be more realistic.

Director Quentin Tarantino expressed interest in directing an adaptation of Casino Royale, but Eon was not interested. He claims to have worked behind the scenes with the Fleming family, and believed this was the reason why filmmakers finally went ahead with Casino Royale. Tarantino also said he would have set it in the 1960s and would have only made it with Pierce Brosnan as Bond. In February 2005, Martin Campbell, who previously directed GoldenEye (1995), was announced as the film's director. Later in 2005, Sony led a consortium that purchased MGM, allowing Sony to gain distribution rights starting with the film.

Eon believed that it had relied too heavily on computer-generated imagery effects in the more recent films, particularly Die Another Day, and was keen to accomplish the stunts in Casino Royale "the old fashioned way". In keeping with this drive for more realism, screenwriters Purvis, Wade and Haggis wanted the script to follow as closely as possible the original 1953 novel, keeping Fleming's darker storyline and characterization of Bond.
Due to copyright issues related to the ownership of Thunderball, the organization of which Mr White is a part is not named Spectre.

Casting
Pierce Brosnan had signed a deal for four films when he was cast in the role of James Bond. This was fulfilled with the production of Die Another Day in 2002 and Brosnan officially announced he was stepping down in February 2004. At one point, producer Michael G. Wilson claimed over 200 names were being considered for his replacement. Croatian actor Goran Višnjić auditioned for the role the same day as Craig, but was reportedly unable to master an English accent. New Zealander Karl Urban was considered, but was unable to make the screen test due to filming commitments. According to Martin Campbell, Henry Cavill was the only other actor in serious contention for the role, but at 22 years old, he was considered too young. Cavill would later say that he was turned down by Campbell as he considered him out of shape for the part. Australian actor Sam Worthington and Scottish actor Dougray Scott were also considered. Scottish actor Sam Heughan also auditioned. Campbell and casting directors Janet Hirshenson and Jane Jenkins said Alex O'Loughlin, Julian McMahon, Ewan McGregor, Rupert Friend, and Antony Starr were screen-tested.

In May 2005, British actor Daniel Craig stated that MGM and producers Michael G. Wilson and Barbara Broccoli had assured him he would get the role of Bond, and Matthew Vaughn told reporters MGM offered him the opportunity to direct the new film, but Eon Productions at that point had not approached either of them. A year beforehand, Craig rejected the idea of starring, as he felt the series had descended into formula; only when he read the script did he become interested. Craig read all of Fleming's novels to prepare for the part, and cited Mossad and British Secret Service agents who served as advisers on the set of Munich as inspiring because, "Bond has just come out of the service and he's a killer. [...] You can see it in their eyes, you know immediately: oh, hello, he's a killer. There's a look. These guys walk into a room and very subtly they check the perimeters for an exit. That's the sort of thing I wanted."

On 14 October 2005, Eon Productions, Sony Pictures Entertainment, and MGM announced at a press conference in London that Craig would be the sixth actor to portray James Bond. Taking time off from reshoots for The Invasion, a business-suit clad, rather long-haired Craig boarded a Royal Marines Rigid Raider from  before travelling to HMS President, where he was introduced to the world's press. Controversy followed the decision, with some critics and fans expressing doubt the producers had made the right choice. Throughout the entire production period, Internet campaigns such as "danielcraigisnotbond.com" expressed their dissatisfaction and threatened to boycott the film in protest. Craig, unlike previous actors, was not considered by the protesters to fit the tall, dark, handsome and charismatic image of Bond to which viewers had been accustomed. The Daily Mirror ran a front-page news story critical of Craig, with the headline, The Name's Bland – James Bland.

The next important casting was that of the lead Bond girl, Vesper Lynd. Casting director Debbie McWilliams acknowledged Hollywood actresses Angelina Jolie and Charlize Theron were "strongly considered" for the role and Belgian actress Cécile de France had also auditioned, but her English accent "wasn't up to scratch." French actress Audrey Tautou was also considered, but not chosen because of her role in The Da Vinci Code, which was another Columbia Pictures film released in May 2006. Olivia Wilde was a finalist for the part. On 16 February 2006, French actress Eva Green was announced to play the part.

Filming

Principal photography for Casino Royale commenced on 3 January 2006 and concluded on 20 July 2006. The film was primarily shot at Barrandov Studios in Prague, with additional location shooting in the Bahamas, Italy, and the United Kingdom. The shoot concluded at Pinewood Studios. Michael G. Wilson had stated Casino Royale would either be filmed or take place in Prague and South Africa. However, Eon Productions encountered problems in securing film locations in South Africa. After no other locations became available, the producers had to reconsider their options. In September 2005, Martin Campbell and director of photography Phil Méheux were scouting Paradise Island in the Bahamas as a possible location for the film. On 6 October 2005, Martin Campbell confirmed Casino Royale would film in the Bahamas and "maybe Italy". In addition to the extensive location filming, studio work including choreography and stunt co-ordination practice was performed at the Barrandov Studios in Prague, and at Pinewood Studios, where the film used several stages, the paddock tank, and the 007 Stage. Further shooting in the UK was scheduled for Dunsfold Aerodrome in Surrey, the cricket pavilion at Eton College (although that scene was cut from the completed movie), and the Millbrook Vehicle Proving Ground in Bedfordshire.

After Prague, the production moved to the Bahamas. Several locations around New Providence were used for filming during February and March, particularly on Paradise Island. Footage set in Mbale, Uganda, was filmed at Black Park, a country park in Buckinghamshire, on 4 July 2006. Additional scenes took place at Albany House, an estate owned by golfers Ernie Els and Tiger Woods. The crew returned to the Czech Republic in April, and continued there, filming in Prague, Planá, and Loket, before completing in the town of Karlovy Vary in May. Karlovy Vary was used as the exterior of the Casino Royale, with the Grandhotel Pupp serving as "Hotel Splendide".

The main Italian location was Venice, where the majority of the film's ending is set. The scene with Bond on a sailboat was filmed aboard a  yacht named Spirit.  She was constructed by Spirit Yachts in Suffolk, England, and had to be demasted to fit under various Venetian bridges to reach the filming location.  For this reason, SV Spirit "was the first sailing boat to go up the Grand Canal in Venice for 300 years".

Other scenes in the latter half of the film were shot in late May and early June at the Villa del Balbianello on the shores of Lake Como. Further exterior shooting for the movie took place at properties such as the Villa La Gaeta, near the lakeside town of Menaggio.

A recreation of the Body Worlds exhibit provided a setting for one scene in the film. Among the Body Worlds plastinates featured in that scene were the Poker Playing Trio (which plays a key role in one scene) and Rearing Horse and Rider. The exhibition's developer and promoter, German anatomist Gunther von Hagens also has a cameo appearance in the film, although only his trademark hat is actually visible on screen.

Effects
In designing the credit sequence for the film, graphic designer Daniel Kleinman was inspired by the cover of the 1953 British first edition of Casino Royale, which featured Ian Fleming's original design of a playing card bordered by eight red hearts dripping with blood. Kleinman said, "The hearts not only represent cards but the tribulations of Bond's love story. So I took that as inspiration to use playing card graphics in different ways in the titles," like a club representing a puff of gun smoke, and slashed arteries spurting thousands of tiny hearts. In creating the shadow images of the sequence, Kleinman digitized the footage of Craig and the film's stuntmen on the Inferno visual effects system, at Framestore CFC in London; the actors' silhouettes were incorporated into more than 20 digitally animated scenes depicting intricate and innovative card patterns. Kleinman decided not to use the female silhouettes commonly seen throughout the Bond title sequences, considering that the women did not fit with both the film's spirit and the storyline following Bond falling in love.

For the rest of the film, Chris Corbould, the special effects and miniature effects supervisor, returned to a more realistic style of film making and significantly reduced digital effects. According to Corbould, "CGI is a great tool and can be very useful, but I will fight to the tooth and nail to do something for real. It's the best way to go". Three scenes involving primarily physical effects in the film were the chase at a building site in Madagascar, the Miami Airport chase sequence, and the sinking Venetian house, with sets located on the Grand Canal and in Pinewood Studios.

The first scenes shot were ones involving a Madagascar building site, shot in the Bahamas on the site of a derelict hotel with which Michael G. Wilson had become acquainted in 1977 during the filming of The Spy Who Loved Me. In the scene, Bond drives a digger towards the building, slamming into the concrete plinth on which Mollaka is running. The stunt team built a model and put forward several ways in which the digger could conceivably take out the concrete, including taking out the pillar underneath. A section of the concrete wall was removed to fit the digger and reinforced with steel.

The sequence at Miami International Airport was partly shot at the Dunsfold Aerodrome, in Surrey, which is known from British car show Top Gear, with some footage from the Prague and Miami airports. In filming the scene in which the engine thrust of the moving aircraft blows the police car high into the air, second unit directors Ian Lowe, Terry Madden, and Alex Witt used a crane with a strong lead cable attached to the rear bumper of the vehicle to move it up and backwards at the moment of full extension away from the plane.

The Skyfleet S570 aircraft in the film was an ex-British Airways 747-200B G-BDXJ, which had its engines removed and was modified for its appearance in the film. The modified aircraft had the outboard engines replaced by external fuel tanks, while the inboard engines were replaced by a mock-up pair of engines on each inboard pylon. The cockpit profile was altered to make the 747 look like a prototype of an advanced airliner.

The sinking of the Venetian house at the climax of the film featured the largest rig ever built for a Bond film, with tank consisting of a Venetian piazza and the interior of an abandoned house being constructed. The rig, weighing some 90 tons, incorporated electronics with hydraulic valves that were closely controlled by computer because of the dynamic movement within the system on its two axes. The same computer system also controlled the exterior model, which the effects team had built to one-third scale to film the building eventually collapsing into the Venetian canal.

At the time of filming, Aston Martin was still in the final phases of designing the DBS. Aston Martin delivered two working 'hero' cars to the film. In addition to the two 'hero' cars, Aston Martin had to prepare, and reinforce to withstand impact, three former development DB9s for use as DBS look-a-like stunt cars for the scene involving the car crash. Also a white prototype DB9 manual was supplied to the film crew so that the stunt drivers had something to practice with. Owing to the low centre of gravity of the vehicle, an 18-inch (450 mm) ramp had to be implemented on the road tarmac at Millbrook Proving Grounds and Adam Kirley, the stunt driver who performed the stunt, had to use an air cannon located behind the driver's seat to propel the car into a roll at the precise moment of impact. At a speed exceeding 70 mph (113 km/h), the car rotated seven times while being filmed, and was confirmed by the Guinness Book of Records on 5 November 2006 as a new world record.

Music

The soundtrack of Casino Royale, released by Sony Classical Records on 14 November 2006, featured music composed by veteran composer David Arnold, his fourth soundtrack for the Bond film series, while Nicholas Dodd orchestrated and conducted the score. Producers Michael G. Wilson and Barbara Broccoli announced on 26 July 2006 Chris Cornell had composed and would perform the title song, "You Know My Name". The song's main notes are played throughout the film as a substitute for the James Bond Theme, to represent Bond's youth and inexperience. The classic theme only plays during the end credits to signal the climax of his character arc.

Promotional marketers
In a reported £14million deal between the film's production and car manufacturer Ford, Ford's 2007 model Mondeo would appear in the film and it being driven by the Bond character. Both Sony and Sony Ericsson also made deals, making prominent appearances of tech products in the film including a Blu-ray player, Vaio laptop, Cyber-shot camera, Walkman NW-HD5 digital music player, and a Sony Ericsson K800i handset.

Release
Casino Royale premiered at the Odeon Leicester Square, the Odeon West End and the Empire simultaneously in London on 14 November 2006. It marked the 60th Royal Film Performance and benefited the Cinema & Television Benevolent Fund (CTBF), whose patron, Queen Elizabeth II, was in attendance with the Duke of Edinburgh. Along with the cast and crew, numerous celebrities and 5,000 paying guests were also in attendance with half the proceeds benefiting the CTBF.

Only two days following the premiere, unlicensed copies appeared for sale in London. "The rapid appearance of this film on the streets shows the sophistication and organisation behind film piracy in the UK," said Kieron Sharp, from the Federation Against Copyright Theft. Infringing copies of the DVD were selling for less than £1.57. Craig himself was offered such a DVD while walking anonymously through the streets of Beijing wearing a hat and glasses to avoid being identified.

In January 2007, Casino Royale became the first Bond film ever to be shown in mainland Chinese cinemas. The Chinese version was edited before release, with the reference to the Cold War re-dubbed and new dialogue added during the poker scene explaining the process of Texas hold 'em, as the game is less familiar in China (this addition is reminiscent of dialogue that was added to the 1954 American TV adaptation to explain the rules of baccarat, the game featured in the original book). Casino Royale has earned approximately $11.7 million in China since its opening on 30 January on 468 screens, including a record opening weekend collection for a non-Chinese film, with $1.5 million.

After critics dubbed Die Another Day "Buy Another Day" because of around 20 product placement deals, Eon limited their promotions for Casino Royale. Partners included Ford, Heineken (which Eva Green starred in adverts for), Smirnoff, Omega SA, Virgin Atlantic and Sony Ericsson.

Home media
Casino Royale was simultaneously released on DVD, UMD and Blu-ray on 16 March 2007. In the UK, Casino Royale was released on 16 March 2007 on DVD and Blu-ray Disc. The DVD and Blu-ray Disc releases broke sales records: the Region 1 Blu-ray Disc edition became the highest selling high-definition title to date, selling more than 100,000 copies since its release. The region 2 DVD edition achieved the record of fastest selling title for its first-week release. The UK DVD has continued to sell well, with 1,622,852 copies sold since 19 March. A copy of the Blu-ray Disc edition of Casino Royale was given out to the first 500,000 PAL PlayStation 3 owners who signed up to the PlayStation Network. The DVD was released in a separate two-disc widescreen and fullscreen editions, both of which includes the official music video for the film, and three documentaries detailing how Daniel Craig was chosen for the role of Bond, the filming, and an expanded version of the Bond Girls Are Forever documentary incorporating new interviews with Casino Royale cast members.

A three-disc edition of Casino Royale on DVD was released in the United Kingdom on 31 October 2008, coinciding with the cinema release of the sequel, Quantum of Solace (the following week in the United States). As well as features present from the 2007 release, the collector's edition contains an audio commentary, deleted scenes, featurettes and a storyboard-to-film comparison. A two-disc Blu-ray version also followed in late 2008, featuring additional supplementary materials, enhanced interactivity through BD-Live, and the previous version's 5.1 PCM soundtrack was replaced with a similar 5.1 Dolby TrueHD soundtrack.

Casino Royale was released a third time on Blu-ray in 2012 with DTS audio and deleted scenes, but it had fewer special features than the 2008 edition. It was released on 4K UHD Blu-ray on 25 February 2020.

Cuts and censorship
Casino Royale was censored for its release in the UK, the US, Germany and China.

In Britain, by omitting some of Le Chiffre's sadism and James Bond's reactions in the torture scene, the film received the desired BBFC 12A rating. In the United States, two fight scenes were censored to achieve a PG-13 rating: the fight between Bond and the traitorous MI6 agent's contact Fisher, and the fight between Bond and Obanno in the stairway at the Casino Royale.

The German edit of the film cuts a sequence where the bomb-planter at the airport breaks a man's neck, instead replacing it with an alternative take. The mainland Chinese cut of the film also trims the torture scene and the stairway fight, as well as a shot of Bond cleaning his wound at the hotel, and a boat scene.

The fully uncensored version can be found on the Australian, Dutch, French, Hong Kong, Japanese, and Scandinavian Blu-ray and DVD releases, on UK Blu-ray releases from 2012 onwards (rated 15), and on the 4K UHD Blu-ray release (branded as an unrated "extended" cut).

Reception

Box office
The film has earned $606,099,584 worldwide. Casino Royale was the fourth-highest-grossing film of 2006, and was the highest-grossing installment of the James Bond series until Skyfall surpassed it in November 2012.

Upon its release in the United Kingdom, Casino Royale broke series records on both opening day—£1.7 million—and opening weekend—£13,370,969. At the end of its box-office run, the film had grossed £55.4 million, making it the most successful film of the year in the UK, and, as of 2011, the tenth-highest-grossing film of all time in the country.

On its US opening day, Casino Royale was on top with $14,741,135, and throughout the weekend grossed a total of $40,833,156, placing it second in the ranking behind Happy Feet ($41.5 million). However, Casino Royale was playing in 370 fewer cinemas and had a better average ($11,890 per cinema, against $10,918 for Happy Feet). It earned $167,445,960 by the end of its run in North America, marking what was at the time the highest-grossing film of the series, before being surpassed by Quantum of Solaces $168.4 million.

On 18 November 2006, Casino Royale opened at the first position in 27 countries, with a weekend gross of $43,407,886 in the non-UK, Irish, US and Canada markets. The film retained the top spot at the worldwide box office for four weeks.

Critical response
On review aggregator website Rotten Tomatoes, the film received an approval rating of 94% based on 263 reviews, with an average rating of 7.9/10. The site's critical consensus reads, "Casino Royale disposes of the silliness and gadgetry that plagued recent James Bond outings, and Daniel Craig delivers what fans and critics have been waiting for: a caustic, haunted, intense reinvention of 007." On Metacritic, the film has a weighted average score of 80 out of 100 based on 46 critics, indicating "generally favorable reviews". Audiences polled by CinemaScore gave the film an average grade of "A−" on an A+ to F scale.

Craig's performance and credibility were particularly praised. During production, Craig had been subject to debate by the media and the public, as he did not appear to fit Ian Fleming's original portrait of the character as tall, dark and suave. The Daily Telegraph compared the quality of Craig's characterization of Bond to Sean Connery's and praised the script as smartly written, noting how the film departed from the series' conventions. The Times compared Craig's portrayal of the character to that of Timothy Dalton, and praised the action as "edgy", with another reviewer citing in particular the action sequence involving the cranes in Madagascar. Critics Paul Arendt of BBC Films, Kim Newman of Empire, and Todd McCarthy of Variety all described Craig as the first actor to truly embody Ian Fleming's James Bond from the original novel: ironic, brutal and cold. Arendt commented, "Craig is the first actor to really nail 007's defining characteristic: he's an absolute swine".

The film was similarly well received in North America. MSNBC gave the movie a perfect 5 star rating. The film was described as taking James Bond "back to his roots", similar to From Russia with Love, where the focus was on character and plot rather than the high-tech gadgets and visual effects that were strongly criticized in Die Another Day. Entertainment Weekly named the film as the fifth best of the series, and chose Vesper Lynd as the fourth best Bond girl in the series. Some newspaper columnists and critics were impressed enough by Craig's performance to consider him a viable candidate for an Academy Award nomination.

Roger Ebert gave the film a four out of four star rating, and wrote that "Craig makes a superb Bond ... who gives the sense of a hard man, wounded by life and his job, who nevertheless cares about people and right and wrong," and that the film "has the answers to all my complaints about the 45-year-old James Bond series," specifically "why nobody in a Bond movie ever seems to have any real emotions." Time Out New York Joshua Rothkopf called Craig "the best Bond in the franchise's history," citing the actor's "crisp, hateful, Mamet-worthy snarl ... This is a screwed-up Bond, a rogue Bond, a bounder, a scrapper and, in the movie's astoundingly bleak coda, an openhearted lover."

Vicky Allan of the Sunday Herald noted Bond himself, and not his love interests, was sexually objectified in this film: A moment where he rises from the sea is reminiscent of Ursula Andress in Dr. No; he feels "skewered" by Vesper Lynd's criticism of him; "and though it would be almost unthinkable now have a female character in a mainstream film stripped naked and threatened with genital mutilation, that is exactly what happens to Bond in [the film]." So although the film backed off from past criticism of Bond girls being sex objects, "the once invincible James Bond becomes just another joint at the meat market." This sentiment is shared by the University of Leicester's James Chapman, author of Licence to Thrill, who also notes Craig's Bond is "not yet the polished article"; he felt his incarnation of Bond is close to Fleming's because he is "humourless," but is also different because "Fleming's Bond did not enjoy killing; Craig's Bond seems almost to relish it." Andrew Sarris of The New York Observer wrote that this particular Bond film is "the very first that I would seriously consider placing on my own yearly 10-best list. Furthermore, I consider Daniel Craig to be the most effective and appealing of the six actors who have played 007, and that includes even Sean Connery."

Roger Moore wrote, "Daniel Craig impressed me so greatly in his debut outing, Casino Royale, by introducing a more gritty, unrefined edge to the character that I thought Sean [Connery] might just have to move over. Craig's interpretation was like nothing we'd seen on screen before; Jimmy Bond was earning his stripes and making mistakes. It was intriguing to see him being castigated by M, just like a naughty schoolboy would be by his headmaster. The script showed him as a vulnerable, troubled, and flawed character. Quite the opposite to my Bond! Craig was, and is, very much the Bond Ian Fleming had described in the books – a ruthless killing machine. It was a Bond that the public wanted." Moore also quipped that his praise was "not heaped lightly," because he had to purchase the DVD himself. Raymond Benson, the author of nine Bond novels, called Casino Royale "a perfect Bond film."

The film met with mixed reactions from other critics. John Beifuss of The Commercial Appeal said, "Who wants to see Bond learn a lesson about ego, as if he were Greg Brady in his 'Johnny Bravo' phase?" Anthony Lane of The New Yorker criticized the more imperfect and self-aware depiction of the character, saying, "Even James Bond, in other words, wants to be 007."

Though American radio personality Michael Medved gave the film three stars out of four, describing it as "intriguing, audacious and very original ... more believable and less cartoonish, than previous 007 extravaganzas"; he commented further that the "sometimes sluggish pacing will frustrate some Bond fanatics." Commentators such as Emanuel Levy concurred, feeling the ending was too long, and that the film's terrorist villains lacked depth, although he praised Craig and gave the film a B+ overall. Other reviewers responded negatively, including Tim Adams of The Observer, who felt the film came off uncomfortably in an attempt to make the series grittier.

In December 2006, Casino Royale was named the best film of the year by viewers of Film 2006. In 2009, UK ice cream company Del Monte Superfruit Smoothies launched an ice lolly moulded to resemble Craig emerging from the sea. In 2008, Entertainment Weekly named Casino Royale the 19th-best film of the past 25 years.

Accolades
At the 2006 British Academy of Film and Television Arts Awards, Casino Royale won the Film Award for Best Sound (Chris Munro, Eddy Joseph, Mike Prestwood Smith, Martin Cantwell, Mark Taylor), and the Orange Rising Star Award, which was won by Eva Green. The film was nominated for eight BAFTA awards, including the Alexander Korda Award for Best British Film of the Year; Best Screenplay (Neal Purvis, Robert Wade, Paul Haggis); the Anthony Asquith Award for Best Film Music (David Arnold); Best Cinematography (Phil Méheux); Best Editing (Stuart Baird); Best Production Design (Peter Lamont, Simon Wakefield); Best Achievement in Special Visual Effects (Steve Begg, Chris Corbould, John Paul Docherty, Ditch Doy); and Best Actor (Daniel Craig). This made Craig the first actor ever to receive a BAFTA nomination for a performance as James Bond. He also received the Evening Standard British Film Award for Best Actor.

Casino Royale won the Excellence in Production Design Award from the Art Directors Guild, and singer Chris Cornell's "You Know My Name" won the International Press Academy Satellite Award for Best Original Song. The film was nominated for five Saturn Awards— Best Action/Adventure/Thriller Film, Best Actor (Daniel Craig), Best Supporting Actress (Eva Green), Best Writing (Purvis, Wade and Haggis) and Best Music (David Arnold). The 2006 Golden Tomato Awards named Casino Royale the Wide Release Film of the Year. Casino Royale was also nominated for, and has won, many other international awards for its screenplay, film editing, visual effects, and production design. At the 2007 Saturn Awards, the film was declared to be the Best Action/Adventure/Thriller film of 2006. Several members of the crew were also recipients of 2007 Taurus World Stunt Awards, including Gary Powell for Best Stunt Coordination and Ben Cooke, Kai Martin, Marvin Stewart-Campbell and Adam Kirley for Best High Work.

See also
 Outline of James Bond

Notes

References

External links

  – official site
 
 
 
 
 

 
2006 action thriller films
2000s adventure films
2000s spy films
2000s American films
2006 films
BAFTA winners (films)
American spy films
British spy films
Czech spy films
German spy films
Columbia Pictures films
2000s English-language films
English-language German films
English-language Czech films
Films scored by David Arnold
Films about terrorism
Films based on British novels
Films directed by Martin Campbell
Films produced by Barbara Broccoli
Films produced by Michael G. Wilson
Films set in 2006
Films set in the Bahamas
Films set in Lahore
Films set in London
Films set in Madagascar
Films set in Miami
Films set in Montenegro
Films set in Prague
Films set in Uganda
Films set in Venice
Films set on beaches
Films set on islands
Films set in a fictional country
Films shot at Pinewood Studios
Films shot in the Bahamas
Films shot in the Czech Republic
Films shot in Italy
Films shot in London
Films shot in Venice
Films about gambling
James Bond films
Metro-Goldwyn-Mayer films
Parkour in film
Films about poker
Reboot films
Films with screenplays by Paul Haggis
Stillking Films films
Trading films
Torture in films
Films set in Serbia
Eon Productions films
Films with screenplays by Neal Purvis and Robert Wade
Films about terrorism in Africa
Films about terrorism in the United States
2000s British films
American spy action films
2000s German films
Casino Royale (novel)